Phuntroo is a 2016 Indian Marathi language Science fiction film, directed by Sujay Dahake and produced by Krishika Lulla and Dhananjay Singh Masoom under the banner Eros International. This is third movie by Sujay Dahake after successful debut film Shala and Ajoba. The film stars Ketaki Mategaonkar and Madan Deodhar in lead roles. The supporting cast features Shivraj Waichal, Shivani Rangole, Ruturaj Shinde, Anshuman Joshi and Rohit Nikam.

Trailer of the film released on Feb 10, 2016.

Plot 
Vira is a mad genius who is deeply love struck on Anaya. Faced with utter rejection from the love of his life, he creates a breakthrough invention that will cure his loneliness.

Cast 
 Ketaki Mategaonkar as Ananya/Phuntroo
 Madan Deodhar as Vira
 Shivani Rangole
 Mohan Agashe 
Shivraj Waichal
 Ruturaj Shinde
 Anshuman Joshi
 Rohit Nikam

References

External links 
 

2010s Marathi-language films
2016 films
Indian science fiction films
2016 science fiction films